The 2013 Wyoming Cowboys football team represented the University of Wyoming in the 2013 NCAA Division I FBS football season. The Cowboys were led by fifth year head coach Dave Christensen and played their home games at War Memorial Stadium. They were members of the Mountain Division of the Mountain West Conference. They finished the season 5–7, 3–5 in Mountain West play to finish in fourth place in the Mountain Division.

Defensive coordinator Chris Tormey was fired mid-season after two straight losses in which the Cowboys surrendered more than 50 points a game; Christensen promoted defensive line coach Jamar Cain to interim coordinator.

On December 1, 2013, the university announced that head coach Dave Christensen had been fired from his position after five seasons with the program.

Schedule

Personnel

Coaching staff

Roster

The name of Ruben Narcisse, who died in a car accident on Sept. 6, 2010, will remain on the Wyoming roster until his freshman class of 2010 graduates as his teammates and coaches wish to continue to honor him as a member of the Wyoming Cowboys. His class indicates the year in school he would be this season.

Box Scores

@ Nebraska

Idaho

Northern Colorado

@ Air Force

@ Texas State

New Mexico

Colorado State

@ San Jose State

Fresno State

@ Boise State

Hawaii

@ Utah State

Statistics

Team

Offense

Defense

Key: SOLO: Solo Tackles, AST: Assisted Tackles, TOT: Total Tackles, TFL: Tackles-for-loss, SACK: Quarterback Sacks, INT: Interceptions, BU: Passes Broken Up, QBH: Quarterback Hits, FF: Forced Fumbles, FR: Fumbles Recovered, BLK: Kicks or Punts Blocked, SAF: Safeties

Special teams

Scores by quarter (all opponents)

References

Wyoming
Wyoming Cowboys football seasons
Wyoming Cowboys football